The Martina tunnel boring machine is a hard rock tunnel boring machine built by Herrenknecht AG. It is the largest hard rock tunnel boring machine in the world and has been used for drilling the Sparvo Tunnel, a part of the larger Variante di Valico project in Italy.

Specifications and operations

The Martina has a shield diameter of 15.55 metres, an excavation diameter of 15.62 metres, a length of 130 metres, a total weight of 4500 tonnes and an annual operating consumption of 62 million kWh. The machine started work on the Sparvo tunnel in 2011, with drilling of the 2430-metre north tube completed in 2012. The drilling of the 2600-metre south tube was finished in 2013, bringing the 5-kilometre tunneling project to an end.

See also

List of longest tunnels
List of long tunnels by type
List of mining companies

References

External links
tunneltalk website
tunnelbuilder website

Heavy equipment
Tunnel boring machines